Miguel Flores (born July 17, 1992) is a Mexican-American professional boxer. He challenged once for the WBA (Super) super featherweight title in November 2019.

Early life
Miguel, a former senior at Sam Houston (Houston, Texas), grew up in the gym watching his brother train. He could sense the respect others had for Ben's dedication to boxing, and Miguel soon craved exactly the same thing. 
His older brother, Benjamin Flores, was a former Super Bantamweight boxer. During a bout, Benjamin was critically hurt and required paramedic attention and was rushed to nearby Parkland Hospital to undergo emergency surgery to relieve swelling on his brain. He died five days later, on May 5, 2009, from brain injuries suffered in the ring.

Amateur career
Flores traveled the country for tournaments and he won Ringside World Championships in 2006 and 2008. He reportedly had about 100 amateur bouts.

Professional career

Featherweight
Miguel's first professional fight came 101 days after his brother died. It lasted 31 seconds. He knocked out his next two opponents in similar fashion.

Professional boxing record

References

External links
 

1992 births
Featherweight boxers
Living people
American boxers of Mexican descent
Boxers from Houston
American male boxers
Mexican emigrants to the United States